École Rockingham School is one of the oldest schools in all of Nova Scotia. Built in 1922, the school was made to accommodate all children grades 1 through 8 despite its small size. The then two room school was later rebuilt in 1975 and because of the population growth in Halifax, it is now only a primary school (Primary through the sixth grade). Classes in Rockingham are offered both in English and French.

External links
 
 History of Rockingham

Elementary schools in Nova Scotia
Bilingual schools
Schools in Halifax, Nova Scotia
1922 establishments in Canada
School buildings completed in 1975